The Gamilaraay, also known as Gomeroi, Kamilaroi, Kamillaroi and other variations, are an Aboriginal Australian people whose lands extend from New South Wales to southern Queensland. They form one of the four largest Indigenous nations in Australia.

Name
It is a common practice among Australian tribes to have themselves identified according to their respective words for "no".

The Kamilaroi Highway, the Sydney Ferries Limited vehicular ferry "Kamilaroi" (1901–1933), the stage name of Australian rapper and singer the Kid Laroi and a cultivar of Durum wheat have all been named after the Kamilaroi people.

Language

Gamilaraay language is classified as one of the Pama–Nyungan languages.  The language is no longer spoken, as the last fluent speakers died out in the 1950s. However, some parts have been reconstructed by late field work, which includes substantial recordings of the related language, Yuwaalaraay, which continued to be spoken down to the 1980s. Analysing these materials has permitted a good deal of reconstructive work. Robert M. W. Dixon and his student Peter Austin recorded some around Moree, while Corinne Williams wrote a thesis on the Yuwaaliyaay dialect spoken at Walgett and Lightning Ridge.

The Gamilaraay, like many other tribes, taught young men a secret language, called tyake, during their rites of initiation. In these systems, the normal profane terms used in everyday speech had to be substituted with the special mystical vocabulary.

Country

History
The Kamilaroi were hunters and agriculturalists with a band-level social organisation. Important vegetable foods were yams and other roots, as well as a sterculia grain, which was made into a bread. Insect larvae, frogs, and eggs of several different animals were also gathered. Various birds, kangaroos, emus, possums, echidnas, and bandicoots were among the important animals hunted. Fish were also consumed, as were crayfish, mussels, and shrimp. Men typically hunted, cleaned, and prepared the game for cooking. Women did the actual cooking, in addition to fishing and farming. Individual Kamilaroi did not eat animals that were their totems.

The nation was made up of many smaller family groups who had their own parcels of land to sustain them. One of the great Kings of this tribe was "Red Chief", who is buried near Gunnedah. The Kamilaroi were regarded as fierce warriors and there is ample evidence of intertribal warfare. The Northern Gamilaroi people have a strong cultural connection with the Bigambul people, and the tribes met regularly for joint ceremonies at Boobera Lagoon near the present-day town of Goondiwindi.

Dreaming
Kamilaroi tradition includes Baiame, the ancestor or patron god. The Baiame story tells how Baiame came down from the sky to the land, and created rivers, mountains, and forests. He then gave the people their laws of life, traditions, songs, and culture. He also created the first initiation site. This is known as a bora; a place where boys were initiated into manhood. When he had finished, he returned to the sky, and people called him the Sky Hero or All Father or Sky Father. He is said to be married to Birrahgnooloo (Birran-gnulu), who is often identified as an emu, and with whom he has a son Turramūlan. In other stories Turramūlan is said to be brother to Baiame. It was forbidden to mention or talk about the name of Baiame publicly. Women were not allowed to see drawings of Baiame nor approach Baiame sites, which are often male initiation sites (boras). Women were instead instructed by Turramūlan's sister, Muni Burribian. In rock paintings Baiame is often depicted as a human figure with a large head-dress or hairstyle, with lines of footsteps nearby. He is always painted in front view; Turramūlan is drawn in profile. Baiame is often shown with internal decorations such as waistbands, vertical lines running down the body, bands and dots.

In Kamilaroi star-lore myth it is recounted that Orion, known as Berriberri set out in pursuit of the Pleiades (Miai-miai) and cornered them in a mother-tree where they were transformed into yellow and white cockatoos. His attempts to capture them were blocked by Turramūlan, a one-eyed, one-legged legendary figure associated with the Pole star. They called Orion's Belt, ghūtūr, a girdle that covered his invincible boomerang.(burran) The seventh of Miai-miai, being less beautiful, was shyand afraid and she was thus transformed into the least visible of the 7 Pleiades.

Rite of initiation
The rite of passage whereby Gamilaraay youths are inducted by initiation into full membership of the tribe was conducted at a Bora ceremony on a bora site especially prepared for the occasion. Tribes ready to participate in such rituals are contacted, and the ceremonies lasted several days.

The pathway leading novices from the larger to the smaller circle was adorned with yammunyamun, figures cut into the exposed sapwood of trees along the route, or drawn on the ground. On the occasion observed by Mathews, on the right hand side,  down the track, was a mocked up bowerbird's nest, and  further on a scarecrow figure with trousers and jacket stuffed with grass, representing a whiteman. As the youths passed along this track, the significance of the symbols and their relevance to tribal beliefs was explained. Further down the path, a yammunyamun image of a bullock was formed from bark, dirt and the animal's skull. Further on, still on the left, was a carved figure of the Emu, apparently crouching, its head pointed towards the large bora. A further  on, parallel to the track and on Goomee's side, a codfish was depicted, and after it the Currea, a serpentine creature, and,  on the other side of the path, two death adders, followed then by a turkey's nest, an earth-stuffed porcupine's skin, and a kangaroo rat's nest. At last, there was a carving of a full tribal man on one side of the track, and an aboriginal woman on the other.

Sandstone Caves

The Sandstone Caves (within the Pilliga Nature Reserve) are co-managed by the Gamilaraay people together with NPWS. All interpretive signage is in the Gamilaraay language followed by English. A small example, created by the Coonabarabran Gamilaraay Language Circle (Suellen Tighe, Maureen Sutler, Sid Chatfield & Peter Thompson), is given below. (See adjoining image.)

Alternative spellings

 Cammealroy
 Comleroy
 Cumilri, Camelleri, Cummilroy, Comleroy, Cummeroy
 Duhai
 Gamilaroi, Gamilroi
 Ghummilarai, Cammealroy, Kahmilari
 Gomeroi
 Goomeroi, Gamilaraay, Gamillaraay
 Gumilroi, Gummilroi, Gummilray, Ghummilarai
 Gunnilaroi
 Kahmilaharoy, Kamilary
 Kamilarai, Kamilari, Kamilaroi, Kamilarai, Kamularoi, Kaamee'larrai, Kamileroi
 Kimilari, Karmil, Kamil, Kahml
 Komeroi
 Koomilroi, Komleroy
 Tjake, Tyake
 Yauan

Source:

Some words
 bundar. (kangaroo)
 buruma. (dog)

Notable Gamilaroi people

Traditional leaders
 Gambu Ganuurru
 Mary Jane Cain

Modern Gamilaraay
 Richard Bell – contemporary artist and co-founder artist collective PROPPA NOW
 Greg Bird – NRL player for Gold Coast Titans
 Brooke Boney – journalist and presenter
 Adam Giles – former politician and former Chief Minister of the Northern Territory
 Jason Gillespie – Australian Test cricketer
 Cameron Hammond – professional boxer
 Donna Hartz – midwife and academic
 Damien Hooper – professional boxer
 Ben Jones – NRL player for Sydney Roosters in 2013 via their reserve grade team Newtown Jets
 The Kid Laroi – rapper, singer and songwriter whose stage name is derived from Kamilaroi
 Mundara Koorang – artist, designer, teacher, elder, actor, and author
 Michael Lett –  NRL player
 Nakkiah Lui – writer, actor, director
 Ray Martin – TV Presenter
 Tracey Moffatt – contemporary artist
 Lyall Munro Jnr (born 1951) – activist and elder
 Lyall Munro Snr (1931–2020) – activist and elder
 Karlie Noon – astronomer
 Thelma Plum – folk singer/songwriter
 George Rose – NRL player for Manly Sea Eagles
 Dale Shearer – former NRL player for Manly-Warringah and other
 Mitch Tambo – electronic/pop/hip-hop singer and songwriter
 Nathan Thomas – waterpolo player who competed in two Olympic games
 Tarryn Thomas – AFL player for the North Melbourne Kangaroos
 Brad Tighe – NRL player for Penrith Panthers
 Corey Tutt – Young Australian of the year NSW 2020, DeadlyScience founder
 Luke Walsh – NRL player for Penrith Panthers
 Len Waters – first and only Aboriginal fighter pilot in World War 2
 Laurence Blacklock-Whitehead - Traditional Visual Artist and Actor
 Jonathan Wright – NRL player for Cronulla Sutherland Sharks
 Connor Watson – Australian NRL player for Newcastle Knights
 Thomas Weatherall – writer and actor in the Netflix show Heartbreak High

See also
 Gamilaroi Nature Reserve
 Gamilaraay language
 gurre kamilaroi
 Kamilaroi Highway

Notes

Citations

Sources

Further reading

 
Aboriginal peoples of New South Wales
New England (New South Wales)